Martin Laumann Ylven (born December 22, 1988 in Oslo, Norway) is a Norwegian professional ice hockey forward. He currently plays for Vålerenga of the Norwegian GET-ligaen.

Ylven joined the Linköpings organization in 2004 and played on their junior teams for three seasons. He made his professional debut in the Elitserien during the 2006–07 season. He returned to Norway in 2007, playing the most games (25) with Stjernen Hockey of the top-level GET-ligaen, before rejoining Linköpings in 2008. He once again return to Norway in 2011, signing for Lørenskog IK.

Ylven was selected to play for the Norway men's national ice hockey team at the 2010 Winter Olympics. He previously represented Norway at the 2005 and 2006 IIHF World U18 Championships, the 2007 and 2008 IIHF World U20 Championship, and the 2009 World Ice Hockey Championships.

Career statistics

Regular season and playoffs

International

External links

1988 births
Living people
Ice hockey players at the 2010 Winter Olympics
Linköping HC players
Lørenskog IK players
Norwegian ice hockey right wingers
Olympic ice hockey players of Norway
IK Oskarshamn players
Ice hockey people from Oslo
Stjernen Hockey players
Vålerenga Ishockey players
Norwegian expatriate ice hockey people
Norwegian expatriate sportspeople in Sweden